Air Chief Marshal Sir Peter Carteret Fletcher,  (7 October 1916 – 2 January 1999) was a senior Royal Air Force officer who served as Vice-Chief of the Air Staff from 1967 to 1970.

RAF career
Educated at St George's College and Rhodes University in South Africa, Fletcher joined the Royal Rhodesian Air Force in 1939 and then transferred to the Royal Air Force. He served in the Second World War as Officer Commanding No. 258 Squadron and as Station Commander at RAF Belvedere in Southern Rhodesia before joining the Directing Staff RAF Staff College (Overseas) in Haifa. After the war he joined the Directing Staff at the Joint Services Staff College and then became a member of the Joint Planning Staff at the Air Ministry. He was appointed Air Attaché in Oslo in 1953, a member of the Directing Staff at the Imperial Defence College in 1956 and Station Commander at RAF Abingdon in 1958. He went on to be Deputy Director of the Joint Planning Staff in 1960, Director of Operational Requirements in 1961 and Assistant Chief of the Air Staff (Policy) in 1964. His last appointments were as Air Officer Commanding No. 38 Group in 1966, Vice-Chief of the Air Staff in 1967 and Controller of Aircraft in 1970 before retiring in 1973.

In retirement he was a Director of Hawker Siddeley, Director of Corporate Strategy and Planning at British Aerospace and then a Member of the  Airbus Industry Supervisory Board.

Family
In 1940 he married Marjorie Kotze; they had two daughters.

References

|-

|-

|-

1916 births
1999 deaths
Fellows of the Royal Aeronautical Society
Knights Commander of the Order of the Bath
Officers of the Order of the British Empire
Recipients of the Air Force Cross (United Kingdom)
Recipients of the Distinguished Flying Cross (United Kingdom)
Royal Air Force air marshals
Royal Air Force personnel of World War II
British air attachés